Silego Technology Inc. was an independent Silicon Valley-based fabless semiconductor company until it was acquired by Dialog Semiconductor on 1 November 2017.

Its products and services were created to design and sell highly configurable power, logic, and timing mixed signal IC products referred to as CMICs (Configurable mixed-signal IC products), they are now part of the Dialog Semiconductor portfolio. Silego was ranked the second-fastest growing semiconductor company in North America at the 2011 Deloitte Technology Fast 500 event held in Menlo Park, California. By August 2016, the company had shipped more than 2 billion CMICs.

Products
 Programmable Mixed-signal Matrix: Dual Supply GreenPAK, GreenPAK with Power Switches, GreenPAK with Asynchronous State Machine (ASM), Micropower Operational Amplifiers.
 High-performance Integrated Power Switches and MOSFET drivers: HFET 1, GreenFET 3, GreenFET 1, CurrentPAK.
 32.768 kHz and MHz clocks: GreenCLK 3, GreenCLK 2, GreenCLK 1, System & Server Clocks.
 BCID, QC 2.0: Fast Charge Identification.

References

External links 
 Official Dialog Semiconductor website

Semiconductor companies of the United States
Manufacturing companies based in California
Technology companies based in the San Francisco Bay Area
Companies based in Santa Clara, California
Computer companies established in 2001
Electronics companies established in 2001
2001 establishments in California